The Tanzania Football Federation  (TFF), previously the Football Association of Tanzania, is the governing body of football in Tanzania. It oversees operations of the Tanzania national football team, Tanzania women's national team and the Tanzanian football league system which comprises the Tanzanian Premier League, Tanzanian First Division League (Championship), First League and Regional Champions League. It was founded in 1945 and has been affiliated with FIFA since 1964. Wallace Karia is the current President of the Tanzania Football Federation as of 2017.

Structure

.

Academy
In January 2008, the Tanzania Football Federation in partnership with Peter Johnson created the Tanzania Soccer Academy (TSA), a national academy to develop football and provide full education scholarships to players.

National stadium
The National Main Stadium is a multi-purpose stadium in Dar es Salaam, Tanzania. It opened in 2007 and was built adjacent to Uhuru Stadium, the former national stadium. It hosts major football matches such as the Tanzanian Premier League and home matches of the Tanzania national football team.

Presidents
 Mr. Ali Chambuso 1967-1974
 Hon. Said El Maamry 1974-1987
 Mr. Mohamed Mussa 1987-1992
 Alhaji. Muhidn Ndolanga 1992-2004
 Mr. Leodgar Tenga 2004-2013
 Mr.Jamal E Malinzi 2013-2017
 Mr. Wallace Karia 2017–present

Staff

References

External links
 Official website
  Tanzania at fifa.com
 Tanzania Sports
 Tanzania at CAF Online

1945 establishments in Africa
Sports organizations established in 1945
National members of the Confederation of African Football
Football in Tanzania
Football
Organisations based in Tanzania